Laura Skujiņa  (born July 10, 1987) is a female wrestler from Latvia. She won the bronze medal the 2014 World Wrestling Championships.

References 

Living people
Latvian female sport wrestlers
Place of birth missing (living people)
World Wrestling Championships medalists
1987 births